Lwamondo is a village in the Vhembe District Municipality, of Limpopo Province, South Africa.  It has been ruled by Vho-Thovhele A. C. Nelwamondo, also known as Ndaedzo which is a regnal name, since 1971. He celebrated his Golden Jubilee in 2022.

Throne succession
 Tshilande
 Mapungwi
 Radali
 Mathule
 Maboho (rule 1830s died 1883)
 Phophi Sidemere (rule 1883 died 1942)
 Lupenyo Mugaguli (rule 1942 died 1970)
 Ndaedzo (ruling since 1971 - )

Villages in Lwamondo
Each of these villages runs its own affairs, under the Headman, who reports directly to Thovhele Aifheli Calvin Nelwamondo (Ndaedzo). The villages are as follows:
 Belemu
 Tshivhale
 Lukau
 Tshitavha : Nelwamondo Vhangani Alfred -Headman
 Badama : Nelwamondo Oupa - Headman
 Tshiseni : Nelwamondo Belson - Headman
 Mutandani
 Matatani
 Vhungwili : 
 Tshifulanani
 Dzwerani
 Zwavhavhili
 Mugomeli
 Khumbe
 Pambani 
 Tshikosi 
 Mathule
 Vhunama
 Mahematshena
 Makambe
 Tshiozwi
 Tshiema
 Thuhwi
 Matavhela
 Tshishushuru
 Tshalovha 
 Mvelaphanda
 Mutshetoni
 Tshidzete

Schools in Lwamondo
There are a number of schools in Lwamondo. Notably, the following:

 Belemu primary
 Tshivhale primary
 Tshiwedza primary
 Makakavhale secondary
 Matshele primary
 Maphuphe primary
 Shondoni secondary
 Luvhaivhai secondary
 Masembelwe primary
 Andries Mugaguli secondary
 Mathule primary
 Tshifulanani primary
 Mutshipisi primary
 Lwamondo secondary
 Tshifhumulo primary
 Ndaedzo secondary
 Mangomani primary
 Dzondo primary
 Mahematshena primary
 Dzwerani primary
 Tshikhovhokhovho primary

References

Populated places in the Thulamela Local Municipality